Andrew David Clement (born 12 November 1967) is a Welsh former footballer who played as a full back. He appeared in the Football League for Wimbledon, Bristol Rovers, Newport County and Plymouth Argyle.

After finishing his playing career he was manager at Bisley, Farnborough (2007–08) and  joint manager with Ian Savage at Eversley in April 2011.

Honours 
Woking
 FA Trophy: 1993–94

References

1967 births
Living people
People from Leytonstone
Welsh footballers
Association football defenders
Wimbledon F.C. players
Newport County A.F.C. players
Bristol Rovers F.C. players
Woking F.C. players
Plymouth Argyle F.C. players
Staines Town F.C. players
Yeovil Town F.C. players
English Football League players
National League (English football) players
English football managers
Bisley F.C. managers
Farnborough F.C. managers
Eversley & California F.C. managers